Bav River is a river in Ratnagiri district of Maharashtra. It originates in the Western Ghats and flows near Marleshwar.

References 

Rivers of Maharashtra
Ratnagiri district